Annadha Shilpangal is a 1971 Indian Malayalam film, directed by M. K. Ramu and produced by P. S. Veerappa. The film stars Prasad, Sankaradi, Sreelatha Namboothiri and T. R. Omana in the lead roles. The film had musical score by R. K. Shekhar.

Cast

Prasad
M. L. Saraswathi
Sankaradi
Sreelatha Namboothiri
T. R. Omana
Bahadoor
Usharani
Prem Nawas
Paul Vengola
William Thomas
Kalmanam Murali
Sudheer
Jayshree T. in item number

Soundtrack
The music was composed by R. K. Shekhar and the lyrics were written by Sreekumaran Thampi.

References

External links
 

1971 films
1970s Malayalam-language films